The Progressive Republican Party (PRP) was a Spanish political party created in 1880 by Manuel Ruiz Zorrilla. Ruiz Zorrilla wrote his testament in January 1895 declaring his successor, and thus the reins of the party were passed to José María Esquerdo upon Ruiz Zorrilla's death. The latter helped to create the Republican Union in 1903. Following the death of Esquerdo, the party dissolved in June 1912, integrating into the Reformist Party of Melquíades Álvarez and Gumersindo de Azcárate.

References

See also
Liberalism and radicalism in Spain

Defunct political parties in Spain
Defunct liberal political parties
Political parties established in 1880
Political parties disestablished in 1903
1880 establishments in Spain
1903 disestablishments in Spain
Radical parties
Republican parties in Spain
Restoration (Spain)